John McKendrick (born 11 May 1969) is a Scottish football referee.

McKendrick is a senior lecturer in human geography at Glasgow Caledonian University.

References

External links 
 Soccerbase profile

1969 births
Living people
Scottish football referees
Academics of Glasgow Caledonian University
Scottish scholars and academics
Scottish Football League referees
Scottish Premier League referees
Scottish Professional Football League referees